"For the Good of the Outfit" was the 28th episode of the television series M*A*S*H, the fourth episode of season two. The episode was aired on October 6, 1973.

Plot
Hawkeye and Trapper discover that most of the patients in their latest surgery shift are from the nearby village of Taedong, which has just been shelled. The shrapnel fragments they recover prove to be American, and they learn that the only artillery in the area is an Army unit. They file a report on the shelling in hopes of securing compensation for the village, ignoring Henry's warning that it may bring reprisals.

Major Stoner soon arrives from the Inspector General's office to look into the report. Confronted by Hawkeye's demand for an investigation, he collects the evidence (shrapnel and X-rays), promises to open a case, and departs. After a week and a half with no response, Hawkeye and Trapper are stunned to read an article in Stars and Stripes that blames the shelling on enemy forces.

Hawkeye angrily calls Stoner, who promises to sort out the matter, and writes home to ask his father to use his connections with one of Maine's United States Senators in order to bring the truth to light. The letter is intercepted, and Henry puts Hawkeye under arrest and tells him that the Army has started rebuilding Taedong. However, Hawkeye is still not satisfied, as he wants the Army to admit responsibility for the shelling.

When General Clayton arrives for a visit, Hawkeye and Trapper tell him about their evidence, only to learn that it has vanished and Stoner has been reassigned to a post in Honolulu. Clayton urges them to drop the matter or risk being transferred to the front lines because they have no proof. Meanwhile, Frank and Margaret, having misread the situation, become convinced that Pierce and McIntyre will receive commendations and steal glory from Frank. They give Clayton shell fragments and medical records on Frank's patients; faced with these new facts, Clayton promises to run a truthful account of the incident in Stars and Stripes.

In the epilogue, Radar reads a letter from home to Hawkeye during surgery. The Maine senator has just been indicted on charges of influence peddling and is facing a 20-year prison term, and Hawkeye's father is starting to regret stuffing the ballot box for him.

External links

M*A*S*H (season 2) episodes
1973 American television episodes
Television episodes directed by Jackie Cooper